Enciclopedia Combi Visual is an encyclopedia edition printed in Barcelona, Spain in 1974 composed of 18 volumes.  The first set is coloured red containing five books, the second in white containing 13.  The encyclopedia edition was primarily composed of black and white pictures (many coloured), several are hand drawn.  The contents include subjects such as economy, wildlife, human evolution, colonialism, animals and medicine.

 Format - 17.6 x 24.5 cm
 Five books in the red edition contain 2,500 pages.

Spanish encyclopedias
1974 non-fiction books
20th-century encyclopedias